Moses Rischin (1925-2020) was an American historian, author, lecturer, editor, and emeritus professor of history at San Francisco State University. He coined the phrase new Mormon history in a 1969 article of the same name.

Rischin is considered an authority on American ethnic and immigration history and a pioneer in the field of American Jewish history. Historian Selma Berrol, however, has challenged the minimal treatment Rischin has given to the tensions between earlier German Jews and later Russian Jews in America.

Biography
Rischin was born and raised in Brooklyn, New York City. His undergraduate studies were at Brooklyn College. Harvard University awarded him a Ph.D. in 1957.

Ruschin became a professor at San Francisco State University in 1964. In addition to his professorship, he sat on the board for the Journal of American Ethnic History and on the council of the American Jewish History Society. During the Monica Lewinsky scandal, Rischin was a signatory of "Historians in Defense of the Constitution" wherein 400 historians criticized efforts to impeach President Bill Clinton.

He was the longtime director of the Western Jewish History Center, at the Judah L. Magnes Museum, from its founding in 1967; from 2005 until approximately 2010, an annual lecture was given there in his name.

A collection of historical essays was published in Rischin's honor in 1996.

A character in the 1967 novel Meyer Meyer by Helen Hudson may have been partly modeled after him.

Books
The Promised City: New York's Jews, 1870-1914 (Harvard University Press) 
Jews of the American West, with John Livingston (Wayne State University Press)

Articles and essays
"The New Mormon History", The American West 6, March 1969, 49.
"The Jewish Experience in America: A View from the West"
Foreword to California Jews (2003) Brandeis University Press

Awards 

 1963: National Jewish Book Award in The Promised City: New York's Jews, 1870-1914

See also
"I'll take Manhattan: reflections on Jewish studies" by Deborah Dash Moore

References

External links 
 

1925 births
2020 deaths
Anthologists
Cultural historians
Harvard University alumni
Historians of Jews and Judaism
Historians of the American West
Historians of the Latter Day Saint movement
Jewish American historians
American male non-fiction writers
American magazine writers
San Francisco State University faculty
Writers from California
21st-century American historians
21st-century American male writers
Brooklyn College alumni
People from Brooklyn
Historians from New York (state)
21st-century American Jews